Fantastic Treasures II is a supplement for fantasy role-playing games published by Mayfair Games in 1985.

Contents
Fantastic Treasures II is a supplement listing hundreds more magic items and weapons drawn from myths and legends around the world, alphabetized from M to Z, with a random treasure determination table for both volumes.

Publication history
Fantastic Treasures II was written by Alan Hammack, with a cover by Boris Vallejo, and was published by Mayfair Games in 1985 as a 96-page book.

Reception

References

Fantasy role-playing game supplements
Role Aids
Role-playing game supplements introduced in 1985